Marcelino Antonio Malabanan Maralit Jr. was appointed bishop of the Roman Catholic Diocese of Boac by Pope Francis on December 31, 2014. He replaced Bishop Reynaldo G. Evangelista after he was installed as the Bishop of Imus in April 2013.  He was ordained by Cardinal Gaudencio Rosales on March 13, 2015 at the Metropolitan Cathedral of San Sebastian Lipa City, and installed as the fourth Bishop of Boac on March 17, 2015.

Education
1976-1979: Elementary - (Primary) Canossa Academy
1979-1981: Elementary - (Intermmediate) De la Salle — Lipa City
1981-1985: High School — St. Francis de Sales Minor Seminary, Lipa City
1985-1989: Philosophy — St. Francis de Sales Major Seminary, Marawoy Lipa City
1989-1994: Sacred Theology — Universidad de Navarra, Pamplona, Spain
1999-2003: Post Graduate Studies — Studies Licentiate and Doctorate courses in Ecclesiastical History — Pontificia, Universita Santa Croce, Rome, Italy

Ordinations
Maralit was eventually appointed as the Bishop of Boac on December 31, 2014. On March 13, 2015 at the San Sebastian Cathedral in Lipa City he was ordained as bishop by Cardinal Gaudencio Rosales, the Archbishop Emeritus of Manila, which coincided with his 20th Sacerdotal Anniversary. He was installed at Bishop of Boac on March 17, 2015.

Bishop of Boac

Maralit was installed as the fourth Bishop of Boac on March 17, 2015. The installation mass was led by Archbishop Ramon Arguelles Lipa Archbishop at the Boac Cathedral. Manila Archbishop-Emeritus Cardinal Gaudencio Rosales along with the bishops and Apostolic Nuncio to the Philippines, Archbishop Giuseppe Pinto, witnessed the installation.

Ministries as a priest
1995-1996 - Parochial Vicar at the Parish of the Immaculate Conception, Bauan, Batangas
1995-1999 - Professor at St. Francis de Sales Major Seminary, Marawoy, Lipa City
1996-1998 – Assistant Director of the Archdiocesan Commission on Vocation
1998-1999 – Director of the Archdiocesan Commission on Vocation
2003-2009 – Professor/Priest/Formator/Vice-Rector/Dean of Studies at St. Francis de Sales Theological Seminary, Marawoy, Lipa City
2006 up to present – Chairman of the Construction Committee of St. Francis de Sales Theological Seminary
2009-2013 – Rector, St. Francis de Sales Theological Seminary
2011-2013 – Parochial Vicar at the Parish of Sto. Niño, Marawoy, Lipa City
2013 up to present – Parish Priest of the Parish of Invencion de la Santa Cruz, Alitagtag, Batangas/Appointed Member of the Presbyteral Council
31 December 2014 - Elected 4th Bishop of the Diocese of Boac

References

1969 births
Living people
21st-century Roman Catholic bishops in the Philippines
People from Lipa, Batangas